Río Mayer Airport  is an airport serving Villa O'Higgins in the Aisén del General Carlos Ibañez del Campo Region of Chile. The town and airport are at the northern end of an arm of Lake O'Higgins, and next to the border with Argentina.

There is mountainous terrain in all quadrants.

See also

Transport in Chile
List of airports in Chile

References

External links
OpenStreetMap - Villa O'Higgins
OurAirports - Villa O'Higgins Airport
SkyVector - Villa O'Higgins Airport

Airports in Chile
Airports in Aysén Region